The Lawrence Batley Theatre is a theatre in Huddersfield, West Yorkshire, England which offers drama, music, dance and comedy.

The theatre is named after Lawrence Batley, a local entrepreneur and philanthropist, who founded a nationwide cash and carry chain.

The building was originally built in 1819 as a Methodist chapel, called the Queen Street Chapel. The architect is unknown but the chief mason was Joseph Kaye, the man who was also responsible for Huddersfield station. It was opened on 9 July 1819 and the reporter in the Leeds Mercury described it as "one of the most handsome and commodious chapels in the kingdom; being capable of accommodating 3000 persons, and has been erected at an expense of from 8 to £10,000".  The chapel became a mission in 1906 until a decline in numbers saw the mission move out of the building in 1970 to a new building in King Street. In 1973 the building was converted into an arts centre.  However serious structural problems were discovered by Kirklees Metropolitan Council in 1975 and the Arts Centre was rehoused into Venn Street Arts Centre and the building remained vacant before being sublet to Novosquash Limited and converted to a squash club known as The Ridings.  It also housed a restaurant and a The Catacombs Disco. In 1989 the Kirklees Theatre Trust was given the go ahead to save the building from deterioration and launch Huddersfield's newest theatre. Building work for the theatre started in September 1992 and took 4 years to complete.

Notable events 

GNUF- a Grand Northern Ukulele Festival
Shakespeare Schools Festival

See also
Listed buildings in Huddersfield (Newsome Ward - central area)

References

External links 

Lawrence Batley Theatre Website

Culture in West Yorkshire
Buildings and structures in Huddersfield
Theatres in West Yorkshire